Ole Kassow may refer to:
 Ole Kassow (rower) (born 1935), Danish rower
 Ole Kassow (social entrepreneur) (born 1966), Danish social entrepreneur